is a Japanese electronics company. It manufactures electronic components and devices and has a strong presence in the telecommunication and automotive industries prior to the consumer markets. It is headquartered in Yao, Osaka and has over 19 factories and more than 12,000 workers.

Its products include connectors, memory card connectors, LCDs (Square and Rounded) and micro switches.

For its application in S-Video, the 4-pin  Hosiden or Ushiden connector is often wrongly called mini-DIN connector. Hosiden Besson Limited was established in 1957, trading as A P Besson and Partner Limited in the UK, manufacturing earpieces for the National Health Service. It was sold to Crystalate Electronics in 1971 to form the Besson division, and as part of a manufacturing group it assimilated injection mouldings and designed and manufactured printed circuit boards. On 2 March 1990 Hosiden Corporation, acquired the company. Its capabilities now include acoustic, electronic, research and development, fire products, transmission products, manufacture and assembly, injection molding, and distribution.

References

External links
Hosiden corporate site (English)
Hosiden Besson website (English)

Manufacturing companies of Japan
Companies listed on the Tokyo Stock Exchange